The Swedish Wikipedia is the Swedish-language edition of Wikipedia and was started on the 23 of May 2001. A majority were generated by Lsjbot, a bot, or software application.
The administrators on the Swedish Wikipedia (currently ) are elected for a fixed-term period of one year and have to be re-elected after that time.

History 

Swedish Wikipedia was launched by Jimmy Wales on the 23 May 2001 as Wikipedia's 4th language version. The "Phase I" UseModWiki software for sv.wikipedia.com was translated by Linus Tolke and the "Phase III" MediaWiki was translated by Dan Koehl together with Johan Dahlin and Max Walter. The latter, contemporary PHP-engined MediaWiki Swedish interface premiered on sv.wikipedia.org 1 December 2002, becoming the foundation for later updates. Dan Koehl was appointed Swedish Wikipedia's first "sysop". He set up the early community features such as Bybrunnen, maintenance functions such as sabotage deterrence, pioneered much of its fundamental corpus of articles, and called to the first Tinget. This wiki "thing" of 24 November 2002 became the first instance akin to an arbitration committee on any Wikipedia language version, effectively making Swedish Wikipedia the first decentralised franchise while the rest of Wikipedia was still under Jim Wales' direct personal supervision.

The first years, Swedish Wikipedia functioned as a small, foreign-franchised competitor to the independently Swedish UseModWiki Susning.nu created by Lars Aronsson in 2001, inspired by the English Wikipedia. However, the founder's decision to allow advertisement on the website from 20 November 2002 led Dan Koehl to switch over to Swedish Wikipedia, with several prolific contributors gradually following suit. Although Susning.nu became the world's second largest wiki 28 May 2003, in April 2004, its editing features were closed down to all but a handful of users, which further increased the flow to Swedish Wikipedia. On 14 January 2005, Wikipedia's article count surpassed that of Susning.nu. Susning.nu was shut down entirely in August 2009.

In March 2006, the Swedish newspaper Svenska Dagbladet published a comparative evaluation of Swedish Wikipedia, Susning.nu and the online version of Nationalencyklopedin. The evaluation was done by giving a selection of articles to independent subject matter experts for grading. While Nationalencyklopedin came out on top with respect to factuality and neutrality, Swedish Wikipedia received a good overall grade and came out on top with respect to being up to date and having a broad coverage, also including popular culture subjects.

Massive deletions in robot-made articles 
On 27 September 2012 it reached 500,000 articles. On 15 June 2013 it reached 1,000,000 articles and rose from 8th to 5th place. This is in large part due to a community project where bots were used in producing articles for all existing species of plants and animals. When finished, this project alone created more than a million articles, most short and sourced through available online databases on the subject. In 2014 about half of its articles were created by a single bot. During 2015 and 2016, Lsjbot wrote more than 1 million geographical articles, increasing the number of articles to nearly 3.8 million by November 2016 when it stopped. While this practice allowed the Swedish Wikipedia to become the second largest worldwide, quality suffered from a lack of sourcing, shallow articles, duplicates, and outdated information. Facing these problems, tide turned against the bots and article deletions started outpacing new creations. From the 2016 maximum of 3.8 million articles, the count to below 3.3 million articles in March 2021, and as of December 2021, the count dropped below 2.8 million articles.

Gallery

Topics 
In 2019 the Swedish Wikipedia had 354,000 unique categories. The average article in this language version had 5 categories and ratio of unique categories to articles was 0.094. The categories with the largest number of articles in 2019 were Life (30%) and Geography (24%). In the Swedish Wikipedia, articles related to Geography and Life had the highest average quality. Content about Health was read more often and articles in the Events category had the highest average author interest.

Verifiability 
In March 2020 the Swedish Wikipedia contained 20.1 million references, wherein 4.31% of them had a DOI and 0.72% of references contained an ISBN.

See also
Danish Wikipedia
Norwegian Wikipedia
Nationalencyklopedin

References

External links
  Swedish Wikipedia
  Swedish Wikipedia mobile version

Swedish encyclopedias
Wikipedias by language
Wikipedias in Germanic languages
Wikipedia
Internet properties established in 2001
2001 establishments in the United States
2001 establishments in Sweden